GGCL may refer to:
 Girls Greater Cincinnati League
 Gujarat Gas Company Limited